A large quantity of rolling stock formerly owned and operated by Southern Pacific Railroad has been preserved in museums and on tourist railroads across North America.

Preserved steam locomotives

Preserved diesel locomotives

Preserved passenger cars

Preserved freight cars

Preserved cabooses

Preserved maintenance of way equipment

Formerly preserved, scrapped

Notes

References 
 
 

Southern Pacific Railroad
Diesel locomotives of the United States

Rail passenger cars of the United States
Rolling stock of the United States
Rail transportation preservation in the United States
Southern Pacific Railroad